Iranians in Lebanon are people of Iranian background or descent residing in Lebanon. Some of them are Lebanese citizens while some are migrants or descendants born in Lebanon with Iranian heritage. Many Iranians in Lebanon live in Nabatieh.  Many of the Iranians in Lebanon are carpet traders.

Notable people
 Masoud Boroumand (1928–2011), Iranian footballer
 Mostafa Chamran (1932–1981), Iranian physicist, politician, commander and guerrilla fighter
Musa al-Sadr (1928–1978), Lebanese-Iranian philosopher and Shia religious leader

See also
Arab-Persians
Iran–Lebanon relations
Iranian diaspora
Lebanese people in Iran
2013 Iranian embassy bombing
Kurds in Lebanon

References

Lebanon
Middle Eastern diaspora in Lebanon
Ethnic groups in Lebanon
 
Iranian diaspora in the Middle East